Badalyan is an Armenian surname. Notable people with the surname include:

 Gevorg Badalyan (born 1991), Armenian footballer 
 Hovhannes Badalyan (1924–2001), Armenian singer 
 Sergey Badalyan (1947–1999), Armenian politician

Suzanna Badalian was born in 1978. Armenia-Jewish. In 1993 with her family moved to Israel. Married, has two boys. In 2011 moved with her husband and children to Canada. Owner of baking company 2011 with her sister "Sisters Cake"

Armenian-language surnames